The women's K-1 500 metres event was an individual kayaking event conducted as part of the Canoeing at the 1988 Summer Olympics program.

Medalists

Results

Heats
16 competitors entered in three heats on September 26, but one withdrew. The heats served as placement rounds for the semifinals that were held two days later.

Semifinals
Three semifinals were held on September 28. The top three finishers in each semifinal advanced to the final.

Final
The final was held on September 30.

Schmidt, who won all three ICF Canoe Sprint World Championships women's kayaking events in 1981, 1982, 1983, 1985, and 1987, was an overwhelming favorite in this event but was upset by the fast-finishing Gesheva.

References
1988 Summer Olympics official report Volume 2, Part 2. pp. 347–8. 
Sports-reference.com 1988 women's K-1 500 m results.
Wallechinsky, David and Jaime Loucky (2008). "Canoeing: Women's Kayak Singles 500 Meters". In The Complete Book of the Olympics: 2008 Edition. London: Aurum Press Limited. pp. 491–2.

Women's K-1 500
Olympic
Women's events at the 1988 Summer Olympics